"Monster" is a song credited to American recording artist Michael Jackson, featuring 50 Cent, released on Jackson's first posthumous album, Michael. The song was allegedly written by Michael Jackson, Eddie Cascio, James Porte, and its rap part was written by Curtis Jackson. Along with "Breaking News" and "Keep Your Head Up", the song was allegedly recorded in the Porte/Cascios' basement in 2007. These tracks have been controversial since their release, with Jackson's fans and family members doubting their authenticity.

On August 21, 2018, the California Court of Appeal heard the oral argument for the appeal. It was incorrectly reported that Sony Music had conceded that the three songs "Breaking News", "Keep Your Head Up" and "Monster" featuring 50 Cent was indeed performed by an impersonator, Jason Malachi and not Michael Jackson, however, Sony's lawyer Zia Modabber stated that "no one has conceded that Michael Jackson did not sing the songs". Due to the controversy, the scheduled single was canceled. On July 6, 2022, Jackson's estate and Sony Music removed the song from streaming services Spotify and Apple Music amid allegations that the vocals are not Jackson's, but in fact singer/Jackson impersonator Jason Malachi.

Background and release
"Monster" was allegedly written by Michael Jackson, Eddie Cascio, and James Porte, with the rapping segment written by Curtis Jackson. Jackson allegedly recorded the songs in 2007 while he was living with the Cascio family in New Jersey. Other tracks recorded during that time include "Breaking News" and "Keep Your Head Up" (and also: "All I Need", "All Right", "Everything's Just Fine", "Black Widow", "Burn Tonight", "Let Me Fall in Love", "Soldier Boy", "Ready to Win", "Stay" and "Water"). 50 Cent did not record together with Jackson physically. After Jackson's death, he received a call to come into the studio and perform his portion of the track. Once in the studio, the rapper worked with producer Teddy Riley on the song.

On December 10, 2010, the song was officially released on the posthumous album Michael, and 2 original demo versions leaked online in 2015.

Also, an alternative version that doesn't feature 50 Cent surfaced online before the album's official release.

Critical reception 
"Monster" received mainly negative reviews from music critics. Huw Jones from Slant Magazine said "'Monster' is weighed down by an unnecessary rap by the increasingly unnecessary 50 Cent". Alexis Petridis from The Guardian said the song was  "a lumpy attempt to recreate the atmosphere of Thriller'''s title track".
Greg Kot from Chicago Tribune'' said the song picked up "an unfortunate theme in Jackson's latter-day work as the oppressed media victim."

Controversy over authenticity
The authenticity of "Monster" was questioned as soon as it was released. Doubts over whether the vocals were actually by Jackson have been raised, reportedly by Katherine Jackson and Jackson's two eldest children  and many of his fans. His brother Randy Jackson posted a series of messages about the album on his Twitter account stating that family members were not allowed at his studio where the album was being completed. According to Randy, when engineer Teddy Riley played him some of the tracks, "I immediately said it wasn't his voice". In a statement, Sony Music Group countered that it had "complete confidence in the results of our extensive research, as well as the accounts of those who were in the studio with Michael, that the vocals on the new album are his own". Producer Teddy Riley, Frank DiLeo and Jackson's estate have since defended Sony's claims that the song is authentic. Teddy Riley who worked on the songs "Hollywood Tonight", "Monster" and "Breaking News", claimed that he had to do "more processing to the voice, which is why people were asking about the authenticity of his voice". Riley also claimed that "With the Melodyne we actually move the stuff up which is the reason why some of the vibrato sounds a little off or processed, over-processed. We truly apologize for that happening, but you are still hearing the true Michael Jackson".

Many fans who have cast doubt on the Cascio tracks have suggested that singer Jason Malachi sang the lead vocals of the Cascio tracks, but a statement by the Jackson Estate said that he was not involved in the recording. On January 16, 2011, a statement appeared on Malachi's Facebook page noting he was the vocalist of the songs in question, calling it his "confession". He later claimed on MySpace that his Facebook and official website were hacked. Malachi's manager Thad Nauden later that day told TMZ claiming that "someone created a phony Facebook page in Jason's name. Jason wants everyone to know beyond a shadow of a doubt, he did not sing a single note on the album".

On August 23, 2018, it was reported that Sony admitted in court that the vocals on the three Cascio songs were not performed by Jackson and were instead recorded after his death by Malachi. However, Zia Modabber of Katten Muchin Rosenman, Sony's law firm, stated that the claims are not true.

On July 6, 2022, Jackson's estate and Sony Music removed the song, along with "Breaking News" and "Keep Your Head Up", from streaming services Spotify and Apple Music amid the allegations that the vocals are not Jackson's.

Remixes
 "Monster" (Jody den Broeder & Chris Cox Club Mix) – 7:32
 "Monster" (Jody den Broeder & Chris Cox Dub Mix) – 6:15
 "Monster" (Jody den Broeder & Chris Cox Radio Edit) – 3:49

Demos
'"Monster" (Original Demo) – 5:05

Alternative version (without 50 Cent)
 "Monster" (Alternative Version without Rap) – 5:19

Personnel 

 Written by Michael Jackson, Eddie Cascio and James Porte
 Lead Vocal by Jason Malachi 
 Published by Mijac Music, Jab Me Music, Curtis Jackson (50 Cent) Music Publishing 
 Produced by Michael Jackson, Teddy Riley and Angelikson
 Mixed by Jean-Marie Horvat and Teddy Riley
 Programming and finisher by Teddy Riley
 Kids’ Scream: Nigel and Naiden Maynard
 Recording Engineer: Scott Elgin, Khaliq Glover AKA Khaliq-O-Vision, Stuart Brawley, Quenton Gilkey (Assistant Engineer), Luis Navarro, Zachariah Redding (Assistants Engineer on the Rap) (Recorded at Boom Boom Room), Glen Marchese, Joe Corcoran, Drew Harris
 Rap Performed by 50 Cent
 Drum Programming: James Porte, Joe Cocoran and Chalmer McDermott

 Percussion by Rudy Bird and Joe Cocoran
 Bass by Eddie Cascio and Stuart Brawley
 Keyboards by Eddie Cascio and Stuart Brawley
 Guitars by Joe Corcoran and Orianthi
 Special FX Guitars by Jake Landau
 String Arrangement by Eddie Cascio and Stuart Brawley
 Cello by Cameron Stone
 Violin by Sharon Jackson
 Background Vocals by Michael Jackson, Jason Malachi, James Porte, and Prince Jackson 
 Digital Editing by Joe Corcoran
 Assisted by Drew Harris and Fiona Brawley
 Recorded at The Backyard, LA

See also
 List of unreleased Michael Jackson material
 Death of Michael Jackson
 List of works published posthumously

References

Songs about monsters
2010 songs
Michael Jackson songs
50 Cent songs
Songs written by Michael Jackson
Songs written by 50 Cent
Song recordings produced by Michael Jackson
Song recordings produced by Teddy Riley
Songs released posthumously